Toray Arrows may refer to:

Toray Arrows (men's volleyball team)
Toray Arrows (women's volleyball team)